Joachim Stachuła (1 February 1940 – 9 March 2013) was a Polish footballer.

After winning promotion he scored Śląsk Wrocław's first ever goal in the top flight, a 15th minute penalty against Gwardia Warsaw on 19 August 1964. In 1966 he returned to Thorez Wałbrzych, which changed their name to Zagłębie Wałbrzych in their promotion year in 1968. Stachuła played in 136 Ekstraklasa matches for them scoring 9 goals in 6 seasons.

He played in one match for the senior Poland national football team on 30 April 1969 in a 3-1 win against Turkey. He previously represented the B national team and the youth team.

He died aged 73 after a long illness.

Bibliography
Filip Podolski Śląsk Wrocław. 30 sezonów w ekstraklasie, n.d.
Roman Szczurowski Zagłębie Wałbrzych w rozgrywkach ekstraklasy, wyd. Bytom 2009

References

External links
 
Joachim Stachuła at National Football Teams.com

1940 births
2013 deaths
Polish footballers
Poland international footballers
Śląsk Wrocław players
Zagłębie Wałbrzych players
Association football forwards